The following units and commanders fought in the Mine Run campaign of the American Civil War on the Union side. The Confederate order of battle is shown separately.

Military rank abbreviations used 
 MG = Major General
 BG = Brigadier General
 Col = Colonel
 Ltc = Lieutenant Colonel
 Maj = Major
 Cpt = Captain
 Lt = Lieutenant
 Sgt = Sergeant

Army of the Potomac 
MG George G. Meade, Commanding

General staff and headquarters 

 Chief of Staff: MG Andrew A. Humphreys
 Chief of Artillery: BG Henry J. Hunt
 Assistant Adjutant General: BG Seth Williams
 Chief Quartermaster: BG Rufus Ingalls
 Provost Marshal General: BG Marsena R. Patrick 
 1st Maryland Cavalry : Maj Charles H. Russell
 80th New York (20th Militia): Ltc Jacob B. Hardenbergh
 93rd New York: Ltc Benjamin C. Butler
 1st US Cavalry (squadron): Cpt Isaac R. Dunkelberger
 Engineer Brigade: BG Henry W. Benham
 15th New York (battalion): Maj William A. Ketchum 
 50th New York: Col William H. Pettes
 U.S. Battalion: Cpt George H. Mendell
 Ordnance Detachment: Lt Morris Schaff
 Guards and Orderlies
 Oneida (New York) Cavalry: Cpt Daniel P. Mann
 Signal Corps: Cpt Lemuel B. Norton

I Corps 
 MG John Newton  
 Escort: 4th and 16th Pennsylvania Cavalry (detachments): Cpt Robert A. Robinson

II Corps 
 MG Gouverneur K. Warren 
 Escort: 10th New York Cavalry, Company M and 13th Pennsylvania Cavalry, Company G: Lt Robert Brown

III Corps 
 MG William H. French

V Corps 
 MG George Sykes
 Provost Guard: 12th New York (Companies D and E): Cpt Henry W. Ryder

VI Corps 
 MG John Sedgwick
 Escort: 1st Vermont Cavalry (detachment): Cpt Andrew J. Grover

Cavalry Corps 
 MG Alfred Pleasonton
 Headquarters Guard: 6th US: Maj Robert M. Morris

Artillery reserve 
 BG Robert O. Tyler

References 
 U.S. War Department, The War of the Rebellion: a Compilation of the Official Records of the Union and Confederate Armies], U.S. Government Printing Office, 1880–1901.

American Civil War orders of battle